River Whyless is an American folk rock rock band from Asheville, North Carolina.

History
Daniel Shearin, Ryan O'Keefe, Halli Anderson, and Alex McWalters met as students at Appalachian State University. They all moved to Asheville after graduation. McWalters said that they considered moving to Austin, Nashville, New York, or Los Angeles, but chose Asheville. O'Keefe, Anderson, and McWalters were already performing in a band when Shearin joined them in 2012.

River Whyless released their first full-length album, titled A Stone, a Leaf, an Unfound Door, in 2012. They followed that by releasing a self-titled EP in 2015. In 2016, the band released their second full-length album, titled We All the Light, via Roll Call Records.

River Whyless released their third studio album, Kindness, a Rebel, in 2018.

Band members
 Ryan O'Keefe: vocals, guitar
 Halli Anderson: vocals, violin
 Daniel Shearin: vocals, bass, harmonium
 Alex McWalters: drums

Discography
Studio albums
 A Stone, a Leaf, an Unfound Door (2012)
 We All the Light (2016)
 Kindness, a Rebel (2018)
 Monoflora (2022)

EPs
 River Whyless (2015)

References

External links

 

Musical groups from Asheville, North Carolina
American folk musical groups
Musical groups established in 2012
Roll Call Records artists
2012 establishments in North Carolina